The following is the 1952–53 network television schedule for the four major English language commercial broadcast networks in the United States. The schedule covers primetime hours from September 1952 through March 1953. The schedule is followed by a list per network of returning series, new series, and series cancelled after the 1951–52 season.

According to television historians Castleman and Podrazik (1982), the fall of 1953 marked a change in television when the networks began filling their schedules with "grade B" material. The networks' "need to fill so many hours of broadcasting each day put the networks and local programmers into the same position that Hollywood had been in years before with its theatrical features." In between big-budget productions, the networks had to keep the public occupied. As the number of hours that the four TV networks offered programs continued to expand, "the appearance of TV equivalents to grade-B films was almost inevitable."

Castleman and Podrazik also point out that another change was taking place around this time. Filmed television series had been seen since the late 1940s, but were "not considered very important to the networks' schedules" because many were of poor quality; live productions from New York were the norm at this time. CBS's success with filmed program I Love Lucy in fall 1951, however, had convinced NBC to add a few filmed series to its fall 1952 schedule. Among NBC's new filmed TV series were My Hero, I Married Joan, and Doc Corkle. The Red Skelton Show, previously airing live, also made the move to film. NBC also moved Skelton's program from its previous late-evening time to 7 p.m. on Sundays, hoping the program would be a "strong lead-in for the entire evening."

NBC's Sunday night strategy failed, however, because Red Skelton's program suffered from excessive use of rerun episodes when Skelton unfortunately fell ill. Of the network's other filmed series, My Hero was "a weak slapstick vehicle" while Doc Corkle was "generally regarded as the worst sitcom of the new season". It lasted only three weeks before cancellation (replaced by the return of the live Mister Peepers). With the exceptions of I Married Joan and the revival of The Life of Riley starring William Bendix in January, NBC would have little luck with filmed programs during the 1952–53 season.

ABC had more luck with its new filmed series, The Adventures of Ozzie and Harriet, while CBS aired the filmed Our Miss Brooks. Another successful CBS filmed show was anthology series Four Star Playhouse, which although not a top-rated show, did prove popular enough to run to 1956.

Fall 1952 was a major blow for DuMont, when the network's biggest  star, Jackie Gleason, moved from DuMont to CBS. Gleason's new CBS series, The Jackie Gleason Show replaced DuMont's Cavalcade of Stars, airing Saturday nights at 8 p.m. Ted Bergmann, DuMont's general director, stated in 2002 that Gleason's much-heralded move to CBS made DuMont look bad. DuMont aired no programs against Gleason's new TV series. One DuMont show, the 60-minute public affairs program New York Times Youth Forum began airing Sundays at 5 p.m. EST on September 14, 1952—outside of prime time—and ran until June 14, 1953. A notable DuMont series which aired during the season was dramatic anthology series Dark of Night, which was broadcast live from a different real-life location each week instead of being shot on a soundstage (for example, one episode was broadcast from a soft drink bottling plant, while another was broadcast from a castle in New Jersey).

New fall series are highlighted in bold.

Each of the 30 highest-rated shows is listed with its rank and rating as determined by Nielsen Media Research.

 Yellow indicates the programs in the top 10 for the season.
 Cyan indicates the programs in the top 20 for the season.
 Magenta indicates the programs in the top 30 for the season.

Sunday 

The Jack Benny Program (12/39.0) appeared every fourth week this season at 7:30-8:00 pm, with Private Secretary replacing This Is Show Business in February. 
On October 26, Doc Corkle was replaced by Mister Peepers after only three episodes.

Monday 

What's My Name was subsequently renamed The Paul Winchell Show, after its stars, Paul Winchell and Jerry Mahoney.

Tuesday 

Note: On December 16, 1952, Wisdom of the Ages replaced Quick on the Draw.

Wednesday

Thursday

Friday 

Notes: The RCA Victor Show Starring Dennis Day was aired in the first half of 1952 and was hence not a new series in the 1952-1953 season. It moved to Monday at 9 p.m. on NBC in the 1953-1954 season under the new title The Dennis Day Show, starring singer Dennis Day.

On Dumont, City Assignment, which ran from February to July 1953, consisted entirely of reruns of episodes of the CBS series Big Town.

Saturday

By network

ABC

Returning Series
The Adventures of Ellery Queen
America in View
The Beulah Show
The Big Picture
Chance of a Lifetime
Feature Playhouse
Hollywood Screen Test
Hour of Decision
Inspector Mark Saber – Homicide Squad
Live Like a Millionaire
The Name's the Same
On Guard
Paul Whiteman's TV Teen Club
The Stu Erwin Show
Tales of Tomorrow
United or Not
The Voice of Firestone
The Wednesday Night Fights
Wrestling from Rainbo Arena
You Asked For It

New Series
The Adventures of Ozzie and Harriet
All-Star News
Anywhere U.S.A.
Back That Fact
Both Sides *
The Dotty Mack Show
Enterprise
Fear and Fancy *
Perspectives
Plymouth Playhouse *
This is the Life Presents "The Fisher Family"
Trouble with Father
What's Your Bid? *

Not returning from 1951–52:
Admission Free
After the Deadlines
The Amazing Mr. Malone
America's Health
Betty Crocker Star Matinee
The Bill Gwinn Show
Byline
The Carmel Myers Show
Celanese Theater
Charlie Wild, Private Detective
The Clock
Crime with Father
Curtain Call
Curtain Up
The Dell O'Dell Show
Don McNeill's TV Club
Gruen Guild Playhouse
Harness Racing
Herb Shriner Time
Hollywood Premiere Theatre
The Jerry Colonna Show
Lesson in Safety
Life with Linkletter
The Marshall Plan in Action
Massland at Home Party
Mr. Arsenic
Mr. District of Attorney
Music in Velvet
On Trial
Other Lands, Other People
Out of the Fog
Paul Dixon Show
Personal Appearance Theater
Pulitzer Prize Playhouse
Q.E.D.
The Ruggles
Say It with Acting
Studs' Place
The Symphony
Versatile Varieties
What Do You Think?

CBS

Returning Series
Amos 'n' Andy
Arthur Godfrey and His Friends
Arthur Godfrey's Talent Scouts
Battle of the Ages (moved from DuMont)
Beat the Clock
Big Town
Break the Bank
City Hospital
Crime Syndicated
Danger
Douglas Edwards and the News
Footlights Theater
The Fred Waring Show
The Garry Moore Show
The Gene Autry Show
The George Burns and Gracie Allen Show
I Love Lucy
I've Got a Secret
The Jack Benny Show
Lux Video Theatre
Mama
Man Against Crime
My Friend Irma
My Little Margie (Moved from NBC mid-season)
Our Miss Brooks
Pabst Blue Ribbon Bouts
The Perry Como Show
Racket Squad
Saturday Night Jamboree
Schlitz Playhouse of Stars
See It Now
Sports Spot
The Stork Club
Strike It Rich
Studio One
Suspense
This Is Show Business
Toast of the Town
The Web
What in the World?
What's My Line?

New Series
Balance Your Budget
Bank on the Stars *
Battle of the Ages
Biff Baker, U.S.A.
Four Star Playhouse
General Electric Theater *
Heaven for Betsy
The Jackie Gleason Show
Jane Froman's U.S.A. Canteen
The Larry Storch Show *
Leave It to Larry
Life with Luigi
Medallion Theatre *
Meet Millie
Mr. and Mrs. North
Omnibus
The Red Buttons Show
Willys Theatre Presenting Ben Hecht's Tales of the City *
Your Jeweler's Showcase
Your Play Time *

Not returning from 1951–52:
The Al Pearce Show
CBS Television Workshop
Crime Photographer
The Eddy Arnold Show
Faye Emerson's Wonderful Town
The Garry Moore Evening Show
Hollywood Opening Night
It's News to Me
The Ken Murray Show
MLB
Police Story
The Sammy Kaye Variety Show
The Show Goes On
Songs for Sale
Star of the Family

DuMont

Returning series
The Arthur Murray Party (moved from ABC)Author Meets the CriticsThe Big IdeaBoxing from Eastern ParkwayBroadway to Hollywood – Headline CluesCaptain Video and His Video RangersCharlie Wild, Private Detective (moved from ABC)City AssignmentDown You GoFord FestivalGeorgetown University ForumGuide RightThe Johns Hopkins Science ReviewKeep PostedLife Begins at EightyLife Is Worth LivingNot for PublicationThe Pet ShopThe PlainclothesmanThe Power of WomenPro Football HighlightsQuick on the DrawRebound (moved from ABC)Rocky King, Inside DetectiveThis Is the Life Presents The Fisher FamilyTrash or TreasureTwenty QuestionsWhat's the StoryWrestling From MarigoldYour Big Moment (aka Blind Date)Youth on the March (moved from ABC)

New seriesThe Big Idea *Dark of NightThe Dave Garroway Show *The Dotty Mack Show *Drama at Eight *Football SidelinesJimmy Hughes, Rookie Cop *The Old American Barn Dance *One Woman's ExperienceThe Paul Dixon ShowThe Power of WomenReport Card for Parents *Stage a NumberSteve Randall *The Strawhatters *This Is the Life Presents "The Fisher Family"Trash or TreasureWhere Was I?Wisdom of the Ages *

Not returning from 1951–52:The Bigelow TheatreThe Cases of Eddie DrakeCosmopolitan TheatreCrawford Mystery TheatreFootball This WeekThe Gallery of Mme. Liu-TsongGuess WhatHands of MysteryJohnny Olson's Rumpus RoomMajor Dell Conway of the Flying TigersNews GalThe Pet ShopPublic ProsecutorShadow of the CloakThe Talent ShopThis is MusicNBC

Returning SeriesThe Aldrich FamilyAll-Star RevueArmstrong Circle TheaterThe Big PayoffThe Big StoryCamel News CaravanCameo TheatreThe Colgate Comedy HourThe Dinah Shore ShowDragnetFireside TheatreGang BustersGillette Cavalcade of SportsGoodyear Television PlayhouseGreatest Fights of the CenturyHollywood Opening NightThe Kate Smith Evening HourKraft Television TheatreMartin Kane, Private EyeMy Little MargieOn the Line with ConsidinePhilco Television PlayhousePublic ProsecutorThe RCA Victor Show Starring Dennis DayThe Red Skelton ShowRobert Montgomery PresentsSummer Stock TheatreTexaco Star TheaterThis Is Your LifeThose TwoTreasury Men in ActionThe Voice of FirestoneWatch Mr. WizardWhat's My NameWho Said That?You Bet Your LifeYour Hit ParadeYour Show of ShowsNew SeriesThe Buick Circus HourThe Campbell PlayhouseCavalcade of AmericaCoke Time with Eddie Fisher *Ding Dong SchoolDoc CorkleThe DoctorEmbassy ClubEye Witness *Gulf PlayhouseThe Herman Hickmann ShowI Married JoanThe Life of Riley *Mister Peepers *My HeroMy Son Jeep *Operation Neptune *The Revlon Mirror Theater *Scott Music HallShort Short DramasSuper Ghost *Those TwoVictory at SeaYour Favorite Story *

Not returning from 1951–52:All-Star RevueAmerican Youth ForumThe Bill Goodwin ShowBob and RayBoss LadyChesterfield Sound-off TimeDuffy's TavernThe Freddie Martin ShowThe Halls of IvyHenry Morgan's Great Talent HuntThe Kate Smith Evening HourLights OutThe Little ShowMohawk ShowroomOne Man's FamilySomerset Maugham TV TheatreThe Speidel Show/The Paul Winchell ShowWayne KingWe, the PeopleYoung Mr. BobbinYour Prize StoryNote: The * indicates that the program was introduced in midseason.

References
Notes

Bibliography
 McNeil, Alex. Total Television. Fourth edition. New York: Penguin Books. .
 Brooks, Tim & Marsh, Earle (1964). The Complete Directory to Prime Time Network TV Shows'' (3rd ed.). New York: Ballantine. .

United States primetime network television schedules
United States network television schedule
United States network television schedule